David Oyetokunbo Oyelowo   (born 1 April 1976) is a British actor, director and producer. His accolades include a Critics' Choice Award and two NAACP Image Awards as well as nominations for two Golden Globe Awards, two Primetime Emmy Awards, a Screen Actors Guild Award and a BAFTA Award. In 2016, he was appointed an Officer of the Order of the British Empire (OBE) for his services to drama.

Oyelowo rose to prominence for portraying Martin Luther King Jr. in the biographical drama film Selma (2014) and Peter Snowdin in the HBO film Nightingale (2014), both of which garnered him critical acclaim. He also achieved praise for his roles as Louis Gaines in The Butler (2013), Seretse Khama in A United Kingdom (2016) and Robert Katende in Queen of Katwe (2016). He has also played supporting roles in the films Rise of the Planet of the Apes (2011), The Help (2011), Lincoln (2012), Red Tails (2012) and Jack Reacher (2012).

On television, Oyelowo has played MI5 officer Danny Hunter in the British drama series Spooks (2002–2004) and Javert in the BBC miniseries Les Misérables (2018). He also provided the voice for Agent Alexsandr Kallus in the Lucasfilm Animation series Star Wars Rebels (2014–2018).

Early life 
Oyelowo was born on 1 April 1976 in Oxford, Oxfordshire, England, to Nigerian parents. His father, Stephen, is from Oyo State, Western Nigeria, and his mother is Igbo, also from Southern Nigeria. He was brought up as a Baptist. He grew up on an estate in Tooting Bec, South London, until he was six, when his family moved to Lagos, Nigeria, where his father worked for the national airline and his mother worked for a railway company. Oyelowo grew up idolizing Sidney Poitier and Denzel Washington. Oyelowo attended a "military-style" boarding-school named Lagos State Model College, Meiran. His family returned to London when Oyelowo was 14, settling in Islington. Oyelowo is an omoba (or prince) of the Yoruba people in the Nigerian chieftaincy system, his grandfather having been king of a "part of Oyo State called Awe". He has commented of his background: "It sounds way more impressive than it actually is. There are so many royal families in Africa", "royal families are a dime a dozen in Nigeria"; "what we think of as royalty in the UK is very different to royalty in Nigeria: if you were to throw a stone there, you would hit about 30 princes. So it's a bit more like being the Prince of Islington: it was useful for getting dates but probably not much else".

While enrolled in theatre studies at City and Islington College, his teacher suggested that he become an actor. Oyelowo enrolled for a year in an acting foundation course, at the London Academy of Music and Dramatic Art (LAMDA). He finished his three-year training in 1998. He also spent time with the National Youth Theatre.

Career

Stage
He began his stage career in 1999 when he was offered a season with the Royal Shakespeare Company playing roles in Ben Jonson's Volpone, as the title character in Oroonoko (which he also performed in the BBC radio adaptation) and Shakespeare's Antony and Cleopatra (1999) alongside Guy Henry, Frances de la Tour and Alan Bates. However, he is best known for his next stage performance as King Henry VI in the Royal Shakespeare Company's 2001 productions of Shakespeare's trilogy of plays about the king as a part of its season This England: The Histories. In a major landmark for colour-blind casting, Oyelowo was the first black actor to play an English king in a major production of Shakespeare, and although this casting choice was initially criticised by some in the media, Oyelowo's performance was critically acclaimed and later won the 2001 Ian Charleson Award for best performance by an actor under 30 in a classical play.

In 2005, he appeared in a production of Prometheus Bound, which was revived in New York City in 2007. In 2006, he made his directorial debut on a production of The White Devil, produced by Inservice, his theatre company in Brighton which is co-run with fellow Brighton-based actors Priyanga Burford, Israel Aduramo, Penelope Cobbuld, and his wife, Jessica. He played the title role in Othello in 2016 at the New York Theatre Workshop with Daniel Craig as Iago, directed by Sam Gold.

Television
Oyelowo is best known for playing MI5 officer Danny Hunter on the British drama series Spooks (known in North America as MI-5) from 2002 to 2004. He had before that appeared in Tomorrow La Scala (2002), Maisie Raine (1998) and Brothers and Sisters (1998). Soon after the end of his time on Spooks Oyelowo also appeared in the two Christmas specials of As Time Goes By (2005). In 2006, he appeared in the television film Born Equal alongside Nikki Amuka-Bird as a couple fleeing persecution in Nigeria – they also both appeared in Shoot the Messenger (2006) and in The No. 1 Ladies' Detective Agency (2008) as a husband and wife. Other cameos have included Mayo (guest-starring on 30 April 2006) and the television film Sweet Nothing in My Ear (2008, as defence attorney Leonard Grisham), while he has played recurring or main characters on Five Days (2007) and The Passion (2008, as Joseph of Arimathea).

In December 2009, he played the leading role of Gilbert in the BBC TV adaptation of Andrea Levy's novel Small Island. In March 2010, he played the role of Keme Tobodo in the BBC's drama series Blood and Oil. He starred in the HBO original film Nightingale (2014). He recently signed a deal with ViacomCBS.

Voice acting
He appeared as Olaudah Equiano in Grace Unshackled – The Olaudah Equiano Story, a radio play adapting Equiano's autobiography, The Interesting Narrative of the Life of Olaudah Equiano. This was first broadcast on BBC 7 on 8 April 2007, with his wife Jessica Oyelowo as Mrs. Equiano.

In 2007, Oyelowo was the reader for John le Carré's The Mission Song. AudioFile magazine stated: "Think of David Oyelowo as a single musician playing all the instruments in a symphony. That is essentially what he manages in this inspired performance of John le Carré's suspense novel.... Can it really have been only one man in the narrator's recording booth? This virtuoso performance makes that seem impossible." In 2015, he was selected to portray James Bond in an audiobook version of Trigger Mortis, written by Anthony Horowitz.

, he provides the voice of Imperial Security Bureau agent Alexsandr Kallus on the animated series Star Wars Rebels. , Oyelowo voices the spirit of Scar, the main antagonist in season 2 of The Lion Guard. Oyelowo voiced the Tiger in a television adaptation of The Tiger Who Came to Tea which aired on Channel 4 for Christmas 2019.

Film

In 2012, Oyelowo appeared in Middle of Nowhere. Writer-director Ava DuVernay had been a fan of his work and had considered asking him to take the role, however before she could, Oyelowo received the script coincidentally from a friend of a friend of DuVernay's who happened to be sitting next to him on the plane and was considering investing in the project. The film premiered at the 2012 Sundance Film Festival to critical raves. That same year Oyelowo appeared in Lee Daniels' The Paperboy, which competed for the Palme d'Or at the 2012 Cannes Film Festival. Oyelowo reunited with Daniels the following year in The Butler.

In 2014, Oyelowo formed his own independent production company, Yoruba Saxon Productions which has co-produced movies that featured him including, Nightingale, Captive, Five Nights in Maine and most recently, A United Kingdom.

He worked with DuVernay again for Selma (2014), playing civil rights activist Martin Luther King Jr. The film, based on the 1965 Selma to Montgomery voting rights marches, had originally been set to be directed by Lee Daniels, but the project was dropped by Daniels so he could focus on The Butler.

He is slated to star with Lupita Nyong'o in a film adaptation of the Chimamanda Ngozi Adichie novel Americanah. The story follows a pair of young Nigerian immigrants who face a lifetime of struggle while their relationship endures.

In February 2019, it was announced that Oyelowo had joined the Peter Rabbit cast with James Corden, Rose Byrne and Domhnall Gleeson reprising their roles as the title character, Bea and Thomas McGregor for its sequel due to be released in March 2021.

In 2020, Oyelowo starred alongside George Clooney in the Netflix film The Midnight Sky. More recently, his Yoruba Saxon company signed a first look deal with Disney. The first film to come out of the deal will be The Return of the Rocketeer, a Disney+-exclusive sequel to the 1991 film The Rocketeer, which Oyelowo will produce alongside his wife, Jessica, and Brigham Taylor. Oyelowo is also being considered to star in the film, which will center on "a retired Tuskegee airman who takes up the Rocketeer mantle".

Awards and honours
For his portrayal of Martin Luther King Jr. in Selma, Oyelowo received the NAACP Image Award for Outstanding Actor in a Motion Picture. He received his first Golden Globe Award nomination for Best Actor in a Motion Picture – Drama, while also receiving a nomination for Critics' Choice Movie Award for Best Actor.

Also in 2014, for his performance in Nightingale, he won the Critics' Choice Television Award for Best Actor in a Movie/Miniseries and was nominated for the Primetime Emmy Award for Outstanding Lead Actor in a Limited Series or Movie, Golden Globe Award for Best Actor – Miniseries or Television Film, NAACP Image Award for Outstanding Actor in a Television Movie, Mini-Series or Dramatic Special and a Satellite Award for Best Actor – Miniseries or Television Film.

Oyelowo was appointed Officer of the Order of the British Empire (OBE) in the 2016 New Year Honours for services to drama.

Personal life
He is married to actress Jessica Oyelowo, who he met at LAMDA and with whom he has four children. They live in Los Angeles, California.

A devout Christian, Oyelowo has stated that he believes God called him to play Rev. Martin Luther King Jr. Reflecting on his portrayal of King in the film Selma, Oyelowo has asserted: "I always knew that in order to play Dr. King, I had to have God flow through me because when you see Dr. King giving those speeches, you see that he is moving in his anointing."

A dual citizen, Oyelowo and his wife became naturalized US citizens on 20 July 2016. On doing so, he stated: "I did a film called Selma... and that film centres on voting rights and I've lived here for nearly 10 years now and to be walking around and doing a film about voting rights and telling people to vote, and you can't vote yourself is a little hypocritical. I decided it's time to do it and no time better than now."

Filmography

Film

Television

See also
 Black British elite, Oyelowo's class in Britain

References

External links

 
 
 
 
 

1976 births
Living people
Actors from Oxford
20th-century British male actors
21st-century British male actors
Alumni of City and Islington College
Alumni of the London Academy of Music and Dramatic Art
Audiobook narrators
Black British filmmakers
Black British male actors
British expatriate male actors in the United States
British male film actors
British male radio actors
British male Shakespearean actors
British male stage actors
British male television actors
British male voice actors
British people of Nigerian descent
British people of Yoruba descent
English Christians
Ian Charleson Award winners
Male actors from Oxfordshire
National Youth Theatre members
Naturalized citizens of the United States
Officers of the Order of the British Empire
Royal Shakespeare Company members
Yoruba male actors
Yoruba princes